Scotogramma ptilodonta is a species of cutworm or dart moth in the family Noctuidae. It is found in North America.

The MONA or Hodges number for Scotogramma ptilodonta is 10244.

Subspecies
These three subspecies belong to the species Scotogramma ptilodonta:
 Scotogramma ptilodonta albescens McDunnough, 1943
 Scotogramma ptilodonta nevada Barnes & McDunnough, 1912
 Scotogramma ptilodonta ptilodonta

References

Further reading

 
 
 

Hadenini
Articles created by Qbugbot
Moths described in 1883